KCCV (760 AM and 92.3 FM, Bott Radio Network) are radio stations broadcasting a Christian talk and teaching radio format to the Kansas City metropolitan area. Both stations are licensed to communities in Kansas, the AM station to Overland Park and the FM to Olathe. They are owned by the Bott Broadcasting Company.  KCCV-AM-FM are the flagship stations for the Bott Radio Network.

760 KCCV's transmitter is off East Coal Mine Road in Kansas City, near Interstate 435. It is powered at 6,000 watts by day.  But because AM 760 is a clear channel frequency, KCCV must reduce power at night to 200 watts to avoid interfering with  Class A WJR Detroit.  The transmitter for 92.3 KCCV-FM is in Olathe, off West 103rd Terrace. In addition to the main signal, 760 KCCV is also heard on two FM translators. K245CC 96.9 FM is licensed to Olathe, and K268CF 101.5 FM is licensed to Kansas City, Missouri.

While all the Bott radio stations in the Kansas City radio market carry Christian talk and teaching programs, they are not fully simulcast.  KCCV-FM 92.3 has a slightly different schedule than KCCV AM 760.  The two translator stations at 96.9 and 101.5 simulcast AM 760.  National religious leaders heard on KCCV and KCCV-FM include Chuck Swindoll, Jim Daly, Charles Stanley, John MacArthur, Alistair Begg and David Jeremiah.

History
The station that is today KCCV (AM) signed on the air in 1947 as KANS. It first broadcast at 1510 kHz and was licensed to Independence, Missouri.  KANS was a daytimer, powered at 1,000 watts and required to go off the air at night.  Richard Bott bought KANS in 1962, the first station in the Bott Radio Network.  He switched it to a Christian radio format, calling it "Kansas City's Christian Voice."  Bott said during a 55th anniversary broadcast in November 2017, that he felt a responsibility and calling to start a Christian radio station.

KCCV-FM signed on the air on December 1, 1993. While it was not yet built, in 1992, the Bott Broadcasting Company bought the construction permit for $537,500.  The plan was to have KCCV-FM air Christian programs around the clock, since the AM station was limited to daytime-only broadcasts.  The call letters were chosen to represent "Kansas City's Christian Voice."

In 1989, Bott Broadcasting was issued a construction permit to build a new AM station, licensed to Overland Park, at 760 kHz.  KCCV (AM) went on the air in 1990, with Bott moving its programming from AM 1510 to AM 760.  While 760 at first was also a daytime-only station, its lower position the AM dial and 6,000 watt transmitter gave it one of the best signals in the Kansas City radio market.  A few years later, the Federal Communications Commission (FCC) granted KCCV permission to stay on the air at night, but with a reduced power of 200 watts.

References

External links

CCV-FM
Olathe, Kansas
Moody Radio affiliate stations
Radio stations established in 1989
Bott Radio Network stations
CCV
1989 establishments in Kansas